New Llano is a town in Vernon Parish, Louisiana, United States. The population was 2,504 at the 2010 census. It is part of the Fort Polk South Micropolitan Statistical Area.

Originally known as Stables, the town was renamed when 200 members of the Socialist commune Llano del Rio Cooperative Colony in California relocated to this site in 1917, giving the town its present name. It continued to function as a socialist commune with citizens pooling and sharing resources and wealth until 1937.

History
The New Llano Cooperative Colony was founded in 1917 when Job Harriman relocated, with other commune members of the Llano del Rio colony, to 20,000 acres of cut-over land two miles south of Leesville. The location chosen was the Gulf Lumber Company sawmill town named Stables. The mill had burned in 1913 and again in 1916. After the sawmill burned the second time it was not rebuilt because the stumpage reserves were depleted. The land, was sold on contract to the Cooperative Colony.

The colony attempted to achieve self-sufficiency, through community ownership of a newspaper, broom factory, sawmill, ice plant, and sheet metal factory. There was also a school, infirmary, hospital, and recreational facilities. The colony closed in 1937.

New Llano has developed a reputation as a "speed trap." Local media has covered allegations of predatory ticket-writing.

Geography
According to the United States Census Bureau, the town has a total area of 1.0 square mile (2.5 km), all land.

Demographics

2020 census

As of the 2020 United States census, there were 2,213 people, 934 households, and 591 families residing in the town.

2000 census
As of the census of 2000, there were 2,415 people, 925 households, and 640 families residing in the town. The racial makeup of the town was 46.09% White, 40.29% African American, 0.83% Native American, 3.77% Asian, 0.29% Pacific Islander, 4.10% from other races, and 4.64% from two or more races. Hispanic or Latino of any race were 8.57% of the population.

There were 925 households, out of which 40.8% had children under the age of 18 living with them, 46.4% were married couples living together, 18.3% had a female householder with no husband present, and 30.8% were non-families. 24.4% of all households were made up of individuals, and 5.1% had someone living alone who was 65 years of age or older. The average household size was 2.61 and the average family size was 3.11.

In the town, the population was spread out, with 30.8% under the age of 18, 10.6% from 18 to 24, 33.5% from 25 to 44, 19.7% from 45 to 64, and 5.3% who were 65 years of age or older. The median age was 29 years. For every 100 females, there were 100.9 males. For every 100 females age 18 and over, there were 95.8 males.

The median income for a household in the town was $35,417, and the median income for a family was $34,271. Males had a median income of $26,563 versus $20,500 for females. The per capita income for the town was $15,902. About 13.5% of families and 15.6% of the population were below the poverty line, including 18.4% of those under age 18 and 13.9% of those age 65 or over.

References

Further reading
 Ernest S. Wooster, Communities of the Past and Present. New Llano, LA: Llano Colonist, 1924.

External links
 American Utopia: A Brief History of Llano del Rio Cooperative Colony, Louisiana  Public Broadcasting (LPB).

Towns in Louisiana
Towns in Vernon Parish, Louisiana
Utopian socialism
Utopian communities in the United States
Populated places established in 1917